Marzbani (also Romanized as Marzbānī, Marzabānī, and Marzebānī; also known as Marzyānī) is a village in Poshtdarband Rural District, in the Central District of Kermanshah County, Kermanshah Province, Iran. At the 2006 census, its population was 568, in 144 families.

References 

Populated places in Kermanshah County